Henry Arthington (1615 – 19 June 1671) was an English politician who sat in the House of Commons  at various times between 1646 and 1660.

Arthington was the eldest son of William Arthington of Arthington and his wife Anne Tancred, daughter of Thomas Tancred of Brampton Hall. He was baptised on 1 January 1616 and came into the family estate on the death of his father in 1623.  He was commissioner for assessment for the West Riding of Yorkshire from 1643 to 1649,  commissioner for  sequestrations for the West Riding in 1643 and commissioner for the northern association in 1645. In 1646, he was elected Member of Parliament for Pontefract in the Long Parliament and continued to sit in the Rump Parliament after Pride's Purge. He was commissioner for  militia for Yorkshire in 1648 and commissioner. for assessment for  Yorkshire in 1650. In 1650 he became J.P. for the West Riding until 1657. He was  commissioner. for assessment for  Yorkshire in 1652 and became JP for the liberties of Ripon, Sutton, Marston and Otley in 1654.

In 1656 Arthington was elected MP for West Riding in the Second Protectorate Parliament. In 1659 he was commissioner for  militia for Yorkshire 1659.  He joined his brother-in-law, Sir Thomas Fairfax  in the northern movement for a restoration, and helped Bryan Fairfax when he went to Scotland with the secret message for George Monck. Arthington took part in the capture of York in January 1660. He was commissioner  for assessment for West Riding of Yorkshire in January 1660 and commissioner for  militia for Yorkshire in March 1660. He was JP for the West Riding from March 1660 until his death.

In April 1660, Arthington was elected MP for Ripon in the Convention Parliament. He became commissioner for  oyer and terminer on the Northern circuit in July 1660 and a Deputy Lieutenant for the West Riding in August 1660. He was a lieutenant-colonel in the militia by 1661. From 1663 to 1669, he was commissioner for assessment for West Riding of Yorkshire.  1663-9

Arthington died at the age of 56 and was buried at Adel.

Arthington married   Mary Fairfax, daughter of Ferdinando Fairfax, 2nd Baron Fairfax of Cameron on 24 May 1638, and had two sons and four daughters.

References

 

1615 births
1671 deaths
English MPs 1640–1648
English MPs 1648–1653
English MPs 1656–1658
English MPs 1660
Deputy Lieutenants of the West Riding of Yorkshire